La Côte-Saint-André is a commune in the Isère department in southeastern France.

Populations

Personalities
Hector Berlioz was born here. His birthplace is now a museum: Musée Hector-Berlioz.
Philippe du Contant de la Molette was born here.

Archaeological finds

See also
Communes of the Isère department

References

Communes of Isère
Hector Berlioz
Isère communes articles needing translation from French Wikipedia